The 2011–12 Evansville Purple Aces men's basketball team represented the University of Evansville in the 2011–12 NCAA Division I men's basketball season. Their head coach was Marty Simmons and they played their home games at the Ford Center and are members of the Missouri Valley Conference. The Purple Aces participated in the 2012 College Basketball Invitational, losing in the first round.

Previous season
In the previous season, the Purple Aces recorded a 15–14 mark overall, including a 9–9 conference record.  Led by guard Colt Ryan, the team claimed a win against eventual national runner-up Butler. They were invited to the 2011 College Basketball Invitational where they lost in the quarterfinals.

Roster
This season, they return three starters and their top four scorers, including Colt Ryan.  The team features three seniors and five juniors on the roster.  However, the only returning front court player taller than 6'6" is Matt Peeler who saw very limited minutes in prior seasons.

Schedule

|-
!colspan=9 style=| Exhibition

|-
!colspan=9 style=| Regular season

|-
!colspan=9 style=| Missouri Valley tournament

|-
!colspan=9 style=| CBI

References

Evansville Purple Aces
Evansville Purple Aces men's basketball seasons
Evansville
Evans
Evans